Frank Arnold (born 1938) is an Australian director of television series.

Career
He has been credited with:
As director
Behind the Legend episodes for ABC, endorsed by historian Manning Clark. 1972
Ben Hall episodes for ABC, BBC and 20th Century Fox. 1975
Butterfly Island episodes for Independent Productions Pty Ltd. Series One purchased by ABC; Series Two by Seven Network. 1985 children's series
The Castaways episodes for Castaway Productions and ABC. 1974
Dynasty episodes for ABC 1970
Five Mile Creek episodes for Valstar. Series One purchased by Seven network; all three series screened in America by Disney cable channel. 1984—1986
The Haunted School for ABC and Revcom (France), writer Helen Cresswell 1986
Menotti episodes for ABC, starring Peter Gwynne, Ivan Kants, Geoffrey Rush 1981
Over There episodes for ABC; concept by Colin Free 1972
Patrol Boat episodes for ABC; two series: 1979, 1983
Runaway Island episodes for Grundy Organization for Seven network c. 1983 but screened 1985
Rush episodes for ABC starring John Waters. Series One 1974; Series Two 1976
Timelapse episodes for ABC 1980
A Waltz Through the Hills children's miniseries and feature film for Barron Films 1885 cast inc. Ernie Dingo; aired 1990
Going Home (also producer) made-for-TV drama by ABC, written by Colin Free 1977
Ripkin (also producer) made-for-TV drama by ABC, written by Colin Free 1977
Lay Me Down in Lilac Fields (also producer) made-for-TV drama by ABC, written by Colin Free 1981
Death in the Afternoon Documentary on shark attacks by ABC, writer Anne Dunn 1989
Lindsay's Boy (also producer) 1974
Linehaul 1973
Home and Away episodes
Delta episodes for ABC Series One 1969, Series Two 1970

As producer
Premiere four stand-alone dramas for ABC 1980
Shimmering Light made-for-TV drama for Trans Atlantic Enterprises, sold to ABC 1977

Other interests
Arnold and sound engineer Noel Cantrill wrote an e-book Highly Inflamably [sic] recounting their 1966 journey from Sydney to London (Karachi to London in a Kombi van).

References

External links
A Waltz Through the Hills free to view for university or library card holders through Kanopy and Timberland Regional Library.

Australian television directors
1938 births
Living people